Finbarr O'Neill (born 1941) is an Irish retired hurler. He played hurling at club level with Glen Rovers and at inter-county level as a member of the Cork senior hurling team.

Biography

O'Neill joined the Glen Rovers club at a young age and made his senior debut as goalkeeper during the 1964 championship. He won All-Ireland Championship medals in 1973 and 1977. O'Neill also won three Munster Championship medals and five County Championship medals.

At inter-county level, O'Neill was sub-goalkeeper on the Cork senior hurling team that won the All-Ireland Championship in 1966. He had earlier won a Munster Championship medal as a substitute.

Honours

Glen Rovers
All-Ireland Senior Club Hurling Championship (2): 1973, 1977
Munster Senior Club Hurling Championship (3): 1964, 1973, 1977
Cork Senior Hurling Championship (5): 1964, 1967, 1969, 1972, 1976

Cork
All-Ireland Senior Hurling Championship (1): 1966
Munster Senior Hurling Championship (1): 1966
Poc Fada Champion ( 3 ) 1966, 1967 , 1968

References

1941 births
Living people
Glen Rovers hurlers
Cork inter-county hurlers
Hurling goalkeepers